The Seeing Eye, Inc. is a guide dog school located in Morristown, New Jersey, in the United States. Founded in 1929, the Seeing Eye is the oldest guide dog school in the U.S., and one of the largest.  The Seeing Eye campus includes administrative offices, dormitory residence for students, a veterinary care center, and kennels; there is also a breeding station in Chester, NJ. The Seeing Eye, a founding member of the U.S. Council of Guide Dog Schools and a fully accredited member of the International Guide Dog Federation, is a lead researcher in canine genetics, breeding, disease control, and behavior.

History
The history of The Seeing Eye began in Europe in the 1920s when Dorothy Harrison Eustis moved to Vevey, Switzerland, from the United States to set up a breeding and training facility for German shepherds.  Elliott S. "Jack" Humphrey was an American trainer and geneticist who helped Eustis train and develop their own scientific approach to breeding and training.

During World War I, many German soldiers were blinded or visually impaired due to the war, so several schools in Germany began experimenting with guide dogs that were taught specific skills. Eustis wrote an article about it for The Saturday Evening Post called "The Seeing Eye," that was published on November 5, 1927.  Eustis began receiving letters from people who were blind, asking how to obtain a guide dog.

Her article was read to Morris Frank, a 19-year-old blind man from Nashville, Tennessee. Frank, who had been blinded in two separate accidents, believed a guide dog would help him regain his independence. Eustis received his letter and although she did not train dogs for the blind, she decided to help Frank. Frank stated that, in addition to wanting a guide dog, he intended to further the work of training guide dogs for the blind in the U.S. Eustis and Humphrey began to research and modify their own training, as they had previous experience training other types of working dogs, but not guide dogs. In April 1928, Frank met his first guide dog, named Kiss.  He changed her name to Buddy and named all his future Seeing Eye dogs (he had six in total) Buddy. The name is now retired by The Seeing Eye. Frank and Buddy went through six weeks of training that not only created a strong bond, but also taught them to work as a team to navigate busy streets, dangerous obstacles, stairways, crowded shops, and anything that was a danger for Frank. On January 29, 1929, Eustis and Frank established The Seeing Eye in Frank's hometown of Nashville.

Morris Frank and Buddy traveled the U.S. acting as ambassadors for people with disabilities and service dogs.

The first class was held in February 1929, and after several successful graduates were able to demonstrate the usefulness of a guide dog, people started to accept the idea. Mary Dranga Campbell became the head of the social service division in 1934 and retired 11 years later. The Seeing Eye moved to Whippany, New Jersey in 1930, establishing a permanent location for training and student housing. In 1965, the organization moved to its current 60-acre campus in Morris Township, NJ, which includes administrative offices, student residences, a veterinary clinic and kennels. After her death in 1968, Kay Francis estate gave greater than $1 million to this organization.

Since 1929, more than 16,000 partnerships have been created between Seeing Eye dogs and people who are blind and visually impaired from the United States and Canada. The Seeing Eye was the first guide dog school outside of Europe, and is the oldest existing guide dog school in the world. In 2014, The Seeing Eye celebrated its 85th anniversary. In 2020, the Seeing Eye Dog was designated as the state dog of New Jersey.

In April 2005, a lifelike bronze statue of Morris Frank and his dog Buddy was erected on the northeast corner of the Morristown Green. Frank is depicted giving the "forward command."

The Seeing Eye was instrumental in the passage of statewide legislation that made it a criminal offense to harm a service dog and/or service dog-in-training. The bill was inspired by a Seeing Eye puppy-in-training named Dusty, who was severely injured after a pit bull attack, and had to leave the program. On January 17, 2014, Dusty's Law was signed by Governor Chris Christie.

In September 2021, Jim Kutsch, the first graduate of the school to become CEO of the school, was honored with a portrait and a statue on the Morris Township campus. Board member and former New Jersey Governor Tom Kean was present at the ceremony.

Breeds

In 2001, The Seeing Eye built a breeding station on 330 acres in Chester, New Jersey, in which it houses adult breeding dogs and puppies until they are 7 weeks old. All breeding dogs are exercised regularly with walks and outside play. Female dogs are retired at the age of four and males after eight to ten litters. Once retired, the breeders are offered back to their puppy raisers or adopted by someone of the public. The four primary breeds that are used for training are German shepherds, Labrador retrievers, Golden retrievers, and Labrador/golden crosses. On rare occasion Poodles will also be trained if the individual has allergies, replacing what used to be Boxers. Approximately 500 puppies are born each year, with a 75% success rate for dogs who enter the formal Seeing Eye dog training program. From birth, there is a 60% success rate for puppies becoming guides or enter the breeding program. Those who do not make the guide or breeding program are placed in law enforcement, search and rescue, or adopted by their puppy raisers or the public. About 250 dogs reside at the Washington Valley Campus at any given time and about 60 dogs reside at the Breeding Station at Chester.

All puppies at the breeding station are exposed to special play rooms which include toys, different surfaces to walk on, small stairs, and CDs playing sounds such as vacuum cleaners, thunderstorms and various other noises from the ages of four to seven weeks. Volunteers are encouraged to wear hats, glasses and other accessories to get the puppies comfortable with such items.

Basic training
When the puppies are 7 to 8 weeks old, volunteers called puppy raisers will foster these puppies and begin their basic training. Before becoming a puppy raiser, the volunteer must join a puppy club and attend meetings. Puppy sitting is highly encouraged before applying to be a puppy raiser or before receiving a puppy of their own. The volunteer has to live in the coverage area which can be found on the website. The veterinary bills for each puppy is covered by the Seeing Eye and puppy raisers are also assisted in paying for dog food.

As a puppy raiser, it is essential to give the puppy proper socialization that will be needed later in life. The puppy raiser is responsible for exposing the puppy to different environments such as stores, city/urban environments, a variety of people and animals, and anything else they may encounter when out with their future partner. It is important to teach basic commands, which include sit, rest, down, come, basic house manners, and how to walk nicely on a leash - pulling ahead on the handler's left side with little distraction. Puppy raisers attend monthly meetings and outings organized by clubs for additional exposure for the puppies. The meetings are required and allow the puppies to interact with other dogs before and after the meeting begins, learn to ignore other dogs while working with their handler, learn to ignore a variety of distractions such as children and noises, and club leaders and experienced raisers can answer questions that the puppy raiser may have.

The puppies start out with an official Seeing Eye bandanna that indicates they are a puppy in training. Once the dog turns six months old, they are eligible to receive a vest. To obtain a Seeing Eye vest, the dog must have had adequate exposure to that point and know their basic commands very well.

When the puppy is between 12 and 15 months of age, the puppy will then return to The Seeing Eye for formal guide dog training.

Formal training
Once the dogs return for formal training, they first go through health screenings and then are assigned to an instructor. The formal training may take 4 to 6 months, during which time the puppy raiser will receive a postcard from the instructor with an update on how the dog is doing and towards the end will be invited to attend a town walk. A town walk is when a puppy raising family is allowed to follow the dog and instructor from a block behind to see how the dog is doing, and is accompanied by a host who can explain everything the dog and instructor are doing as they are happening. The family is not allowed to interact with the dog, but can take photos and talk with the instructor at the end.

The instructor will begin working with the dog on the campus driveway to get to know the dog and familiarize them with working in a harness. From there, they will move to Morristown, where the dog will learn how to mind up and down curbs, be wary of traffic, obtain spatial awareness, and respond promptly to directional commands. Once the dogs have mastered Morristown, they are brought to New York City to train in a more intense environment.

The important aspect of formal training is for the dogs to respond and understand directional commands. The dogs will learn how to safely cross the street, stop at curbs, stop or guide their owner through obstacles and overhead obstacles also known as clearance. They continue to practice commands such as forward, sit, down, and rest that they learned with their former puppy raising family as well as new commands such as heel. Once the formal training is completed and the dogs have successfully graduated, they are then partnered up with their new owner based on pull, dependability, and personality. From there, the person being matched with the dog will then have ownership of the dog, but can receive help from The Seeing Eye at any point in the partnership if needed. The Seeing Eye is one of the few guide dog schools that gives the graduates ownership of the dog upon graduation.

The Seeing Eye, Inc., matches an average of 260 people who are blind or visually impaired each year with Seeing Eye dogs. As of 2015, The Seeing Eye has matched more than 16,000 people and dogs.

Financials 
Under The United States IRS section 501(c)(3), The Seeing Eye, inc is registered as a non-profit organization.  The school does not receive any government funding.

Applying for a Seeing Eye Dog
The applicant, also known as the student, goes through a screening process, which may take 60 to 90 days. The evaluations are based on amount of residual vision, and each applicant must be at least 16 years of age, have independent travel skills, have physical mobility, have appropriate living conditions, have sufficient hearing ability, and have an appropriate plan for use of the dog. Before the applicant is matched with their dog, the dog must return from the puppy raiser and then complete a four-month training program by an instructor. After the applicant is accepted, the dog will be matched with an appropriate student and together will train at The Seeing Eye. For first time students training sessions will take 25 days, however, for returning students the session will take 18 days. After the training is successfully completed and the student and their dog have graduated, the student receives full ownership of the Seeing Eye dog. The students will have support for a lifetime whether they need advice, have issues, or even require an instructor to assist them. Seeing Eye instructors made 792 follow up visits with graduates in 2011. The Seeing Eye is the only guide dog school that gives full ownership rights to the graduates. Seeing Eye dogs will work approximately seven to eight years. Seeing Eye dogs that are retired will be kept as pets or returned to The Seeing Eye.

The fee charged to students (which includes transportation from anywhere in the U.S. and Canada, room and board, equipment, training, life-time follow-up service, and the dog) has remained unchanged since it was established in the early 1930s: New students pay $150, returning students pay $50, and military veterans pay $1. Students can pay the fee over any time period and no student has ever been turned away due to the inability to pay.

There are currently 1,720 Seeing Eye dog users in the United States and Canada while 16,000 and more partnerships between individuals and dogs have been made since 1929.

See also
List of guide dog schools

References

Bibliography

External links

Guide dogs
Dog organizations
1929 establishments in New Jersey
Morristown, New Jersey
Education in Morris County, New Jersey
Organizations established in 1929